"Back to Life" is a song by American singer-songwriter Alicia Keys, released on September 1, 2016, for the soundtrack of the sports drama film Queen of Katwe, directed by Mira Nair. The song was written by Alicia Keys, Illangelo, and Billy Walsh. Production of the song was handled by Keys and Illangelo.

Critical reception
In a review for the Queen of Katwe soundtrack, Alex Reif of LaughingPlace.com referred to the song as a "beautiful ballad". He additionally stated that, despite its appeal, a few of the other songs on the album ended up overshadowing the song.

Live performances
Keys performed the song on Today on September 3, 2016. Keys performed the song at the Apple Music Festival in Roundhouse, London.

Track listing
 Digital download
 "Back to Life"  – 4:52

Release history

References

2016 singles
2016 songs
Alicia Keys songs
Song recordings produced by Illangelo
Songs written by Alicia Keys
Songs written by Illangelo
RCA Records singles
Reggae fusion songs
Disney songs
2010s ballads
Song recordings produced by Alicia Keys